William Vaughan is a British art historian and has been Emeritus Professor of History of Art at Birkbeck College, University of London since 2003.

He is also a printmaker, and regularly exhibits in London and Bristol under the name Will Vaughan. He is Chair of the Bruton Art Society.

Selected publications 
Caspar David Friedrich 1774–1840: Romantic landscape painting in Dresden: (catalogue of an exhibition held at the Tate Gallery London 6 September-16 October 1972), Tate Gallery, London, 1972. 
Romantic Art, Thames & Hudson, London, 1978. 
German Romanticism and English Art, Yale, 1979. 
Art and the natural world in nineteenth-century Britain: Three essays (The Franklin D. Murphy lectures), Spencer Museum of Art, University of Kansas, 1990. 
German Romantic Painting, Yale 1994. 
Romanticism and Art, Thames & Hudson, London, 1994. 
William Blake, Tate Publishing, London, 1999. 
British Painting: The Golden Age: From Hogarth to Turner. Thames & Hudson, London, 1999. 
Gainsborough, Thames & Hudson, London, 2002. 
John Constable, Tate Publishing, London, 2002. 
Friedrich, Phaidon, London, 2004. 
Samuel Palmer: 1805–1881, Vision and Landscape, Lund Humphries, 2005.  (Editor)
Samuel Palmer: Shadows on the Wall, Yale University Press, 2015.

References

British art historians
Living people
Year of birth missing (living people)
Academics of Birkbeck, University of London
People associated with the Tate galleries